Gavin Charles Alexander Campbell (born 17 March 1946) is a businessman and a former actor and television presenter, mostly known for his stint on That's Life! from 1982 until the show ended in 1994.

Early life
Campbell was born in Letchworth in Hertfordshire, where he grew up. His father was a welder, and his mother later became involved in the women's peace movement. He was educated at St Christopher School, a boarding independent school in the town of Letchworth Garden City in Hertfordshire, followed by the Central School of Speech and Drama in London.

Career

Actor
Campbell began his career as an actor from 1970–71. He was an actor for 15 years. He played the part of Spencer Bodily in a 1968 episode of Department S.

Presenter
Campbell was a presenter on the BBC consumer television show That's Life!. Around 1983 That's Life was attracting 19 million viewers.

In the 1997 general election Campbell presented a video presentation for the Referendum Party, seeking the United Kingdom's withdrawal from the European Union. Five million copies of a VHS cassette with the video were sent to households in target constituencies.

Campbell ran a company called One Hand Clapping Ltd from 1998–2002 with his wife.

Until 2001, he worked for the Money Channel, which later went bankrupt.

In 2001 he wrote a personal finance column for The Mail on Sunday.

Since 2003, Campbell has been part of company called First Growth Direct, based in Lew Trenchard in Devon, which imports wine. Before becoming an actor he had worked as a plongeur in Paris. He has a house in France at Auxerre. He had been a wine director at Berry Brothers and Rudd of London.

Personal life
Campbell lives in Bedford Park, London, near the start of the M4. He married Elizabeth (Liz) in 1985 in Wiltshire and they have four daughters and his wife worked in television. He ran his first London Marathon in 1988, taking 3 hours and 49 minutes. He later ran in aid of the deafblindness charity Sense. He plays the  euphonium.

References

External links
 

1946 births
Alumni of the Royal Central School of Speech and Drama
BBC television presenters
Daily Mail journalists
English male television actors
English television people
English television personalities
English television presenters
Living people
People educated at St Christopher School, Letchworth
People from Letchworth
Wine merchants
Male actors from Hertfordshire